Opanara depasoapicata is a species of small air-breathing land snail, a terrestrial pulmonate gastropod mollusks in the family Charopidae. This species is endemic to French Polynesia.

References

Fauna of French Polynesia
Opanara
Taxonomy articles created by Polbot